The Morris Mohawk Gaming Group (MMGG) is a business-to-business organization which concentrates particularly on the indigenous population of North America by providing technology services to Native-owned Casino industry in the region.

A private company, the MMGG is headquartered in the Mohawk Territory of Kahnawake in Quebec, Canada – part of the seven communities that make up the Mohawk Nation. The MMGG operates pursuant to a remote gaming license issued by the Kahnawake Gaming Commission, and is authorized by that license to offer gaming services worldwide. The MMGG is led by its CEO Alwyn Morris, a member of the Mohawk nation in Kahnawake, and recipient of Order of Canada, the highest order that can be bestowed upon a Canadian civilian.

According to a 2009 interview with CEO Alwyn Morris, following the passage of anti-online gambling legislation by the United States Congress in 2006, the original, Antigua-based Bodog gaming enterprise resolved to withdraw from the United States market. Seizing upon the opportunity, the MMGG then approached Bodog and negotiated an exclusive license to use the brand for the purposes of marketing the MMGG's online gaming services within that region. In July, 2011, Bodog Brand issued a press release announcing that the brand license arrangement with the MMGG would be terminated effective December 31, 2011. On December 14, 2011, the MMGG announced that it would no longer operate any Bodog-branded websites and transitioned all customers to its new site.

Domain Names 
The MMGG originally licensed the www.bodog.com domain from Bodog as an element of their brand license arrangements, but this domain name was seized in September 2007 during a patent dispute between one of Bodog’s domain management suppliers and a company named 1st Technology LLC.

In April 2009, the Morris Mohawk Gaming Group, though not a party to the litigation, settled the case with 1st Technology, acquired all of the seized domains, and returned its website to the original www.bodog.com domain.

On May 23, 2011 the group announced its intention to allow its license agreement with BodogBrand.com for the Bodog.com domain to expire and that it had migrated its services to www.Bodog.eu. Alwyn Morris commented on the transition to the new domain, indicating that the .EU domain would "appeal more directly to the new markets we plan to enter".

In December 2011, the group ceased operations of any Bodog-branded websites. In 2013, Alwyn stepped away from his role as an operator to focus solely on consulting and advising those looking to end in the newly regulated US gaming market. After more than eight years in the Kahnawake region of Quebec in Canada, the group terminated its operations in October 2015. There is no reference to the company in the Directories of Canadian Companies registry.

References

Defunct gambling companies
Defunct poker companies
Gambling companies established in 2006
Gambling companies disestablished in 2015